Anime Salt Lake was an anime convention held during March at the Salt Lake Community College Redwood Campus in Taylorsville, Utah.

Programming
The convention featured an artists’ alley, dealers room, fan discussion panels, live-action roleplaying (LARPing), panels, screenings, and video game contests.

History
The convention was founded by Dana Graham (ParenthesisX) and Christopher R Wilcox (Kurizu204) the president and vice president of the SLCC Japanese Club. After the first successful year the convention was run under the supervision of the Japanese club Dana Graham went on to create Verses Versus Productions LLC that continued to produce Anime Salt Lake, Salt Fest (Salt Lakes first Video Gaming Convention) and Crystal Mountain Pony Con.

Event history

References

Defunct anime conventions
Recurring events established in 2012
2012 establishments in Utah
Annual events in Utah
Festivals in Utah